In linguistics, scheme is a type of figure of speech that relies on the structure of the sentence, unlike the trope, which plays with the meanings of words.
 
A single phrase may involve both a trope and a scheme, e.g.,  may use both alliteration and allegory.

Structures of balance
Parallelism – The use of similar structures in two or more clauses
Isocolon – Use of parallel structures of the same length in successive clauses
Tricolon – Use of three parallel structures of the same length in independent clauses and of increasing power
Antithesis – The juxtaposition of opposing or contrasting ideas
Climax – The arrangement of words in order of increasing importance

Changes in word order
Anastrophe – Inversion of the usual word order
Parenthesis – Insertion of a clause or sentence in a place where it interrupts the natural flow of the sentence
Apposition – The placing of two elements side by side, in which the second defines the first

Omission
Ellipsis – Omission of words
Asyndeton – Omission of conjunctions between related clauses
Brachylogia – Omission of conjunctions between a series of words

Repetition
Alliteration – A series of words that begin with the same letter or sound alike
Anaphora – The repetition of the same word or group of words at the beginning of successive clauses
Anadiplosis – Repetition of a word at the end of a clause at the beginning of another
Antanaclasis – Repetition of a word in two different senses
Antimetabole – Repetition of words in successive clauses, in reverse order
Assonance – The repetition of vowel sounds, most commonly within a short passage of verse
Asyndeton – Lack of conjunctions
Chiasmus – Reversal of grammatical structures in successive clauses
Climax – Repetition of the scheme anadiplosis at least three times, with the elements arranged in an order of increasing importance
Epanalepsis – Repetition of the initial word or words of a clause or sentence at the end of the clause or sentence
Epistrophe – The counterpart of anaphora
Consonance – The repetition of consonant sounds without the repetition of the vowel sounds 
Polyptoton – Repetition of words derived from the same root
Polysyndeton – Repetition of conjunctions
Symploce – Combination of anaphora and epistrophe

See also
Trope (linguistics)
The Elements of Eloquence
Glossary of rhetorical terms

References

External links
 Schemes from Silva Rhetoricae

Figures of speech
Rhetoric